Act of Reprisal is an American drama film directed by Erricos Andreou and Robert Tronson and starring Ina Balin, Jeremy Brett and Giannis Voglis. The film was produced in 1964, but was not released in theaters until 1991. The film depicts a romance set against the backdrop of Cypriot attempts to gain independence from Britain in the 1950s. It was also known as Antekdhikissi.

Cast
 Ina Balin - Maria 
 Jeremy Brett - Harvey Freeman, British Military Officer 
 Kostas Kazakos 
 Yorgos Moutsios 
 Dimitris Nikolaidis 
 Dimos Starenios   
 Nikos Tsachiridis   
 Giannis Voglis

References

External links

1964 films
1964 romantic drama films
American romantic drama films
Films set in Cyprus
1960s English-language films
1960s American films